Salih Zeki Bey (1864, Istanbul – 1921, Istanbul) was an Ottoman mathematician, astronomer and the founder of the mathematics, physics, and astronomy departments of Istanbul University.

He was sent by the Post and Telegraph Ministry to study electrical engineering at the École Polytechnique in Paris. He returned to Istanbul in 1887 and started working at the Ministry as an electrical engineer and inspector.
He was appointed as the director of the state observatory (now Kandilli Observatory) after Coumbary in 1895.
In 1912, he became Under Secretary of the Ministry of Education and in 1913 the president of Istanbul University. In 1917, he resigned as the president but continued teaching at the University in the Faculty of Sciences until his death.

Works

Astronomy
 New Cosmography
 Abridged Cosmography

Physics
 Hikmet-i Tabiiyye
 Mebhas-ı Elektrik-i Miknatisi
 Mebhas-ı Hararet-i Harekiye

History of science
 Asar-ı Bakiye

Mathematics
 Kamus-i Riyaziyat
 Hendese-i Tahliliye
 Hesab-i Ihtimali

References  
 Hüseyin Gazi Topdemir, "Salih Zeki" in The Biographical Encyclopedia of Astronomers, Thomas Hockey, Virginia Trimble, Thomas R. Williams, Katherine Bracher, Richard A. Jarrell, Jordan D. Marché, II, F. Jamil Ragep, JoAnn Palmeri, Marvin Bolt (Eds.), Springer Science+Business Media, LLC, 2007, pp. 1007-1008. 
 Salih Zeki Özel Sayısı (=Osmanlı Bilimi Araştırmaları, vol. 7, no. 1), 2005. (Special issue on Salih Zeki of the journal 'Studies in Ottoman Science', in Turkish.)

1864 births
1921 deaths
Scientists from the Ottoman Empire
Turkish mathematicians
Academic staff of Istanbul University
École Polytechnique alumni
Engineers from the Ottoman Empire
Astronomers from the Ottoman Empire